In baseball, an at bat (AB) or time at bat is a batter's turn batting against a pitcher. An at bat is different from a plate appearance. A batter is credited with a plate appearance no matter what happens during his turn at bat. A batter is not credited with an at bat if he:
Receives a base on balls (BB).
Is hit by a pitch (HBP).
Hits a sacrifice fly or a sacrifice bunt (also known as sacrifice hit).
Is awarded first base due to interference or obstruction, usually by the catcher.
Is replaced by another hitter before his at bat is completed, in which case the plate appearance and any related statistics go to the pinch hitter (unless he is replaced with two strikes and his replacement completes a strikeout, in which case the at bat and strikeout are still charged to the first batter).

At bats are used to calculate certain statistics, including batting average, on-base percentage, and slugging percentage. A player can only qualify for the season-ending rankings in these categories if he accumulates 502 plate appearances during the season.

Pete Rose is the all-time leader in at bats with 14,053, and the only player in MLB history with more than 13,000 at bats. Only 30 MLB players have reached 10,000 career at bats; Miguel Cabrera is the only active player.

Key

List

Stats updated as of the end of the 2022 season.

Notes

References

External links

Major League Baseball statistics
AB